Isabel II Island is the central island of the Chafarinas Islands, in the Mediterranean Sea. The island belongs to Spain. Its area is 0.153 km2 (15.3 ha), and there is a military base and a church.

Name 
The name of the island comes from Isabella II, Queen of Spain from 1833 to 1868.

Geography 
Substantially flatter than the Isla del Congreso, it reaches a maximum height of 35 metres above sea level.

History 

Archeological remains found in the island suggest the existence of an outpost intended for sheltering ships by the 1st century BC, a time when the North-African coastline thrived during the reign of Juba II.

Along the other two islands of the archipelago (Isla del Rey and Isla del Congreso), it was occupied in 1848 by Spain, that alleged terra nullius, anticipating French intentions to do the same from Algeria. General Francisco Serrano took possession of the islands bringing two ships from Málaga.

The works of conditioning of the island of Isabel II suffered a major setback after the passing of a strong storm in March 1849. Then the question arose of whether the stay in the archipelago was worth it or not.

Between 1910 and 1915 the island was connected through a dike with the Isla del Rey.

Electric lighting was installed on the island in 1922.

Population 
The island is the only inhabited island of the archipelago. It currently hosts a military garrison with personnel from the Ministry of Environment of Spain, as the islands are a National Reserve protected because of the wealth of their natural species.

References

Citations

Bibliography 
 
 
 
 
 
 
 
 

Plazas de soberanía
Isabel II